Panruti taluk is a taluk of Cuddalore district of the Indian state of Tamil Nadu. The headquarters of the taluk is the town of Panruti.

Demographics
According to the 2011 census, the taluk of Panruti had a population of 412,654 with 207,509 males and 205,145 females. There were 989 women for every 1,000 men. The taluk had a literacy rate of 67.96%. Child population in the age group below 6 was 23,623 Males and 21,261 Females.

References 

 

Taluks of Cuddalore district